Zainab Salbi (Arabic: زينب سلبي; born 1969) is an Iraqi American women's rights activist and writer. She is the co-founder of Women for Women International and host of Through Her Eyes with Yahoo! News and #MeToo, Now What?, PBS documentary mini series.  

She is the author of several books, including Between Two Worlds: Escape From Tyranny: Growing Up in the Shadow Of Saddam and The Other Side of War: Women's Stories of Survival & Hope.

Early life and education
Salbi was born in 1969 in Baghdad, Iraq. In 1971, she moved to the Mansour district with her parents. Her mother worked as a teacher and her father was a commercial pilot. Her memoir describes her mother Alia as secular, while according to The Daily Beast she was Shia, and raised Salbi "undogmatically". When Salbi was 11, her father became the personal pilot for Saddam Hussein, who then regularly visited the family at their home while he was president of Iraq. The Iran-Iraq War also occurred during her childhood, including missile attacks on Baghdad. She studied languages at an Iraqi university.

At the age of 19, Salbi was sent to the United States after her mother became concerned about the attention Salbi received from Hussein. Her family arranged for her to marry in the United States. She left the marriage after her husband became abusive but could not return to Iraq due to the start of the First Gulf War. She moved to Washington, D.C., worked as a translator, and married Palestinian American lawyer Amjad Atallah. In 1996, she became an US citizen.

Salbi completed her bachelor's degree in sociology and women's studies at George Mason University in 1996, and a master's degree in development studies at the London School of Economics in 2001.

Career

While studying at George Mason University, Salbi learned about the systematic rape during the Bosnian war. In 1993, Salbi and Atallah launched Women for Women International. She began serving as president, initially with a focus on supporting for women in Bosnia-Herzegovina and Croatia. The program linked sponsors in North America with women in Bosnia. The organization was led by Salbi from 1993 to 2011, during which time its humanitarian and development efforts helped over 478,000 women in eight conflict areas and distributed over $120 million in direct aid and micro credit loans. Among the countries Women for Women International focused on were Bosnia, Rwanda, Kosovo, Nigeria, Bangladesh, and Afghanistan.

Iraq was also a focus area for Salbi, and the organization began working there in 2003. Salbi also visited and wrote a report about Iraq for Women Waging Peace in conjunction with the Woodrow Wilson Center on the role of women in the country post-conflict. She later testified before the United States Congress about the report.

By 2006, Salbi had appeared on The Oprah Winfrey Show six times to discuss the organization. In 2006, Women for Women International was awarded the $1.5 million Hilton Humanitarian Prize. In 2008, Women for Women International produced a report with an introduction by Salbi, based on 2004 and 2007 surveys of Iraqi women, including Kurdish, Shi'i, Sunni, Christian, Turkmen, and Sabai'i.

Salbi has written and spoken on the use of rape and other forms of violence against women during war. In 1995, President Bill Clinton honoured Salbi at the White House for her humanitarian work. She was also identified as one of the 100 most influential women in the world in Time Magazine and in The Guardian. Salbi announced her resignation from Women for Women International in 2011.

She was selected as a jury member of The Hilton Humanitarian Prize. Salbi sits on the board of directors of Synergos and the International Refugee Assistance Project.

Media work and public image
In 2015, Salbi launched a talk show with TLC Arabia called Nida'a (the calling in Arabic), with Oprah Winfrey appearing on the first show. The show is broadcast in 22 countries in the Middle East and North Africa and focuses on the acknowledgment of Arab and Muslim women. Salbi then launched The Zainab Salbi Project, an original series with Huffington Post (2016); #MeToo, Now What? with PBS (2018); and Through Her Eyes with Zainab Salbi, with Yahoo! News (2019).

Salbi was identified as an influential Arab woman by Arabian Business, one of the 100 Global Thinkers in the World by Foreign Policy, one of the Most Influential Women on Twitter, by Fortune (2014), and one of the 100 Most Powerful Arabs by Gulf Business (2019).

Awards and honors 
Honored at a White House ceremony for her work in Bosnia (1995)
Time magazine Innovator of the Month (2005) and was profiled in Time for her pioneering work as philanthropist.
Forbes magazine Trailblazer Award (2005)
World Economic Forum's Young Global Leader (2007)
David Rockefeller Bridging Leadership Award (2010)
Austin College Posey Leadership Award (2011)
Visionary Leadership Award - International Festival Of Arts & Ideas (2011)
Honorary doctorate from the University of York (2014)
Great Immigrant by the Carnegie Corporation of New York (2017)
Honorary doctorate from the George Mason University (2019)
Honorary doctorate from the Glasgow University (2019)
Eleanor Roosevelt Val-Kill Award (2019)

Books 

 Between Two Worlds: Escape From Tyranny: Growing Up in the Shadow Of Saddam, 2005, 
 Hidden in plain sight : growing up in the shadow of Saddam, London : Vision, 2006. , 
 The Other Side of War: Women's Stories of Survival & Hope Washington, D.C : National Geographic, 2006. , 
 If You Knew Me You Would Care New York : PowerHouse, 2012. ,  
 Freedom Is an Inside Job: Owning Our Darkness and Our Light to Heal Ourselves and the World, Sounds True, Incorporated, 2018. ,

References

External links
 Zainab Salbi - Twitter
 Official website

Living people
American Muslims
Iraqi Muslims
Iraqi writers
Iraqi women writers
Iraqi women's rights activists
Iraqi emigrants to the United States
Writers from Baghdad
American writers of Iraqi descent
Iraqi humanitarians
American humanitarians
Women humanitarians
1969 births
Iraqi feminists
Proponents of Islamic feminism
American feminist writers
Postmodern feminists
George Mason University alumni
Organization founders
Women founders
Alumni of the London School of Economics
American women's rights activists
People from Baghdad